Government employees in the United States includes the United States federal civil service, employees of the state governments of the United States, and employees of local government in the United States.

Government employees are not necessarily the same as civil servants, as some jurisdictions specifically define which employees are civil servants; for example, it often excludes military employees.

The federal government is the nation's single largest employer, although it employs only about 12% of all government employees, compared to 24% at the state level and 63% at the local level.

State and local employees 
Non-federal employees in states can vary based on unique circumstances: for example, as of 2014, Wyoming had the most per capita public employees due to its public hospitals, followed by Alaska which has a relatively high number of highways and natural resources. The category of Elementary/Secondary Education has the highest employment per capita across states.

In 2012, three states passed major changes to their civil service hiring systems as part of a civil service reform movement, making it easier to hire and fire state employees.

Gender and leadership at the federal level 
A 2011 study found 39% of head leaders, and 36% of leaders in the top two tiers of leadership in 118 U.S. agencies were women. This study did not account for differences in field of expertise, or years of experience. This study found a significant relationship between the gender of the leader and policy area, with women 2.8 times more likely to hold a high leadership position in an agency with a "feminine" policy area, such as education, health or welfare. The same study found that organizations with a female in the top leadership role had more women in second-level leadership positions.

In 2016 women made up 43.3% of the federal executive branch workforce.

See also 
 United States federal civil service
 Public employee pension plans in the United States
 List of federal agencies in the United States

References